The legal status of cocaine varies worldwide. Even though many countries have banned the sale of cocaine for recreational use, some have legalized it for possession, personal use, transportation, and cultivation, while some have decriminalized it for certain uses.
It is necessary to distinguish cocaine from coca leaves or the plant itself.

List by country

References

Further reading
 

Cocaine
Drug control law